Valley Cottage, also known as Wallis House, is a historic home located at Georgetown, Kent County, Maryland, United States. It is a two-story gambrel roofed structure consisting of a 42 feet long 18th century portion with a 16 feet long extension built in 1954.

Valley Cottage was listed on the National Register of Historic Places in 1996.

References

External links
, including photo from 1983, at Maryland Historical Trust
Wallis House, U.S. Route 213, Georgetown, Kent, MD at the Historic American Buildings Survey (HABS)

Houses in Kent County, Maryland
Houses on the National Register of Historic Places in Maryland
Historic American Buildings Survey in Maryland
National Register of Historic Places in Kent County, Maryland